Gaula or GAULA may refer to:

Places
 Gaula (Madeira), a civil parish in the municipality of Santa Cruz in the island of Madeira in Portugal
 Gaula (Trøndelag), a river in Trøndelag county in Norway
 Gaula river valley or Gauldalen, a valley in Trøndelag county in Norway
 Gaula (Vestland), a river in Vestland county in Norway
 Gaula River (India), a river in India originating in the Lesser Himalayas

Other
 Gaula (newspaper), a local Norwegian newspaper
 Gaula (raga), a musical scale (raga) in Carnatic music (South Indian classical music)
 Amadigi di Gaula, a "magic" opera in three acts, with music by George Frideric Handel
 Grupos de Acción Unificada por la Libertad Personal (Unified Action Groups for Personal Liberty), groups in the National Army of Colombia combating hostage-taking